The Manimuthar Dam is located in Manimutharu  away from Tirunelveli in Tamil Nadu, India. It is the biggest reservoir of the Tirunelveli district.
This dam was built in 1958 near Singampatti and Kallidaikurichi, by the then Tamil Nadu Chief Minister K. Kamaraj and K T Kosalram MP to prevent mixing of rainwater with the Bay of Bengal during the rainy season. It can hold water up to 118 feet. The dam is 5,511 million cubic feet. The total length of the dam is 3 km
It irrigated around 65,000 acres of areas in the northern part of the Nanguneri Taluk and Thisayanvilai and southern Veeravanallur, Karispalpatti which are not irrigated by Pachaiyaaru in Tirunelveli district. The downstream joins River Thamirabarani in Kallidaikurichi after 6 km of its journey.

References

Dams in Tamil Nadu
Tirunelveli district
Dams completed in 1958
1958 establishments in Madras State
20th-century architecture in India